Hae-won, also spelled Hay-won, is a Korean unisex given name. Its meaning differs based on the hanja used to write each syllable of the name. There are 32 hanja with the reading "hae" and 46 hanja with the reading "won" on the South Korean government's official list of hanja which may be registered for use in given names.

People with this name include:

Yi Hae-won (born 1919), princess and descendant of the Korean Imperial Household
Chung Hae-won (born 1959), South Korean male football striker and coach (K-League Classic)
Kim Hae-won (born 1986), South Korean male football defender (K-League Classic)
Yoo Hae-won (born 1992), South Korean female badminton player
Haewon Song, South Korean female pianist
Oh Haewon (born 2003), leader and vocalist of the K-Pop group NMIXX

Fictional characters with this name include:
Ban Hae-won, in 2004 South Korean film Temptation of Wolves
Park Hae-won, in 2006 South Korean television series One Fine Day
Hae-won, in 2010 South Korean film Bedevilled
Kim Hae-won, in 2010 South Korean film Acoustic
Haewon, in 2013 South Korean film Nobody's Daughter Haewon
Eun Hae-won, in 2013 South Korean film Steel Cold Winter
Cha Hae-won, in 2014 South Korean television series Wonderful Days
Hae Won, in 2015 American film The Nest

See also
List of Korean given names

References

Korean unisex given names